The Flying Ant is a class of sailing dinghy. The boat has a plywood design originally designed by John Spencer in New Zealand during the 1950s. It is normally sailed by two individuals under 17 years of age.

References

Dinghies